Jillian Bearden is an American cyclist and co-founder of the U.S. Trans National Women’s Cycling Team.

Career
In 2016 she won the Arizona El Tour de Tucson and in 2017 was the first trans woman to race in an American professional peloton.

References 

American transgender people
Transgender sportswomen
American female cyclists
Living people
Year of birth missing (living people)
American LGBT sportspeople
LGBT cyclists